Horses Saratoga Style were two public art events held in 2002 and 2007 in Saratoga Springs, New York. As part of the exhibits, local artists decorated fiberglass horse sculptures.  Each horse had its own theme (some of which related to the company which sponsored the artist. The sculptures were then displayed throughout the city from June through October.  At the end of the event, some of the sculptures were auctioned off and others bought by their company sponsor. A few horses remain on display every summer as a reminder of the project.

In 2002 there were 24 horses and in 2007 the event grew to 34. Horses Saratoga Style was organized by the Saratoga County Arts Council and the YMCA of Saratoga.

The outdoor sculpture exhibit was modeled after the international Cow Parade. Other cities around the world (including Buffalo, New York with its Herd Around Buffalo exhibit) have adapted the event to fit their city's unique personality.  Saratoga Springs is home to Saratoga Race Course (the oldest continuously-running sporting-event complex in the country) and Saratoga Casino and Raceway, so the horse sculptures were a good choice for the city.

External links
Saratoga County Arts Council

Saratoga Springs, New York
Art exhibitions in the United States
Events in New York (state)